Apatzingán (in full, Apatzingán de la Constitución) is a city and municipal seat of the municipality of Apatzingán in the west-central region of the Mexican state of Michoacán.

Geography
The Municipality of Apatzingán is located in the Tierra Caliente Valley. It has an area of 1,656.67 km2 (639.64 sq mi), and reported a population of 99,010 (2010).

The city of Apatzingán is the sixth-largest in Michoacán (behind Morelia, Uruapan, Zamora, Lázaro Cárdenas, and Zitacuaro), with a 2015 census population of 128,250 persons. 
 
The major Sierra Madre del Sur mountain range and the municipality of Coalcomán de Vázquez Pallares are to the west.

History
Mexico's Constitution of Apatzingán was signed in the city in 1814, during the Mexican War of Independence in the Viceroyalty of New Spain against the Spanish Empire.

Six federal police officers were charged with murder on August 21, 2019 for their supposed involvement in a police operation that left nine dead on January 6, 2015 in Apatzingán. At least nine people died and several were injured when police fired against members and sympathizers of self-defense groups who had taken over the municipal palace.

Climate

See also
 Immaculate Conception Cathedral, Apatzingán

References

Sources
 Link to tables of population data from Census of 2005  Instituto Nacional de Estadística, Geografía e Informática (INEGI)
 Michoacán Enciclopedia de los Municipios de México
 " Photograph from Apatzingan's main church

External links
 Ayuntamiento de Apatzingán Official website
 Apatzingan Map

Municipalities of Michoacán